Saroleh Rural District is a rural district (dehestan) in Meydavud District, Bagh-e Malek County, Khuzestan Province, Iran. At the 2006 census, its population was 9,820, in 1,950 families.  The rural district has 39 villages.

References 

Rural Districts of Khuzestan Province
Bagh-e Malek County